Rasoul Kor (born June 24, 1989) is an Iranian footballer who plays for Mes Kerman F.C. in the IPL.

Club career
In 2010, Kor joined Mes Kerman F.C. after spending the previous season at Tarbiat Yazd F.C. in the Azadegan League.

Assist Goals

References

1989 births
Living people
Shamoushak Noshahr players
Sanat Mes Kerman F.C. players
Tarbiat Yazd players
Iranian footballers
Footballers at the 2010 Asian Games
Association football defenders
Asian Games competitors for Iran